Qhairul Anwar Roslani (born 22 January 1987 in Seremban, Negeri Sembilan) is a Malaysian footballer currently playing for PDRM FA in Malaysia Super League as a defender.

He was a member of the Negeri Sembilan FA team that made the final of the 2010 Malaysia Cup, but lost to Kelantan FA.

References

External links
 

Living people
1987 births
Malaysian footballers
Terengganu FC players
Felda United F.C. players
Negeri Sembilan FA players
People from Negeri Sembilan
Association football defenders